Irina-Camelia Begu was the defending champion, but lost to Ons Jabeur in the first round.

Anastasija Sevastova won the title, defeating Petra Martić in the final, 7–6(7–4), 6–2.

Seeds

Draw

Finals

Top half

Bottom half

Qualifying

Seeds

Qualifiers

Qualifying draw

First qualifier

Second qualifier

Third qualifier

Fourth qualifier

References

External Links
Main Draw
Qualifying Draw

Bucharest Openandnbsp;- Singles
2018 Singles